Miccolamia rugosula is a species of beetle in the family Cerambycidae. It was described by Holzschuh in 2003. It is known from India.

References

Desmiphorini
Beetles described in 2003
Insects of India